Butterworth Hospital may refer to:

Butterworth Hospital (Eastern Cape)
Butterworth Hospital (Michigan)

Trauma centers